Sir el Gharbieh is a village just north of the Litani River, in the Nabatieh District in southern Lebanon.

History
In the 1596 tax records, it was named as a village, Sir, in the Ottoman nahiya (subdistrict) of Sagif under the liwa' (district) of Safad, with a population of 10 households, all Muslim. The villagers paid a fixed tax-rate of 25% on agricultural products, such as wheat, barley, olive trees, goats and beehives, in addition to "occasional revenues"; a total of 2,000 akçe.

On 23 February 1985, the Israeli Army shot dead seven young men from the village. Six of the dead were aged between fifteen and twenty. They were chosen after a round up of all the village men and machine gunned in the legs, two were bayoneted in the abdomen and one held under water until he drowned.

People 
Hassan Maatouk, the Lebanon national football team all-time goalscorer and most-capped player, is native to Sir el Gharbiyeh.

References

Bibliography

External links
 Sir el Gharbiyeh, Localiban

Populated places in Nabatieh District